Three United States Coast Guard Cutters have been named Escanaba:
 , commissioned in 1932 and sunk in 1943 during the Battle of the Atlantic.
 , commissioned in 1946 and scrapped in 1974.
 , commissioned in 1987 and currently active.

United States Coast Guard ship names